Events from the year 2017 in the Republic of Macedonia.

Incumbents
 President: Gjorge Ivanov
 Prime Minister: Emil Dimitriev (until May 31), Zoran Zaev (starting May 31)

Events
 March
 24 March – scheduled date for the Macedonian local elections, 2017

 April
 27 April – Dozens of Macedonian nationalists storm the Macedonian parliament after the election of Talat Xhaferi as Speaker of the Assembly.

Sport
Continuing from 2016: The 2016–17 Macedonian Football Cup

Deaths
7 March – Slavko Brezoski, architect (b. 1922).
9 May – Zoran Madžirov, percussionist (b. 1968)

References

 
Macedonia
Macedonia